Robert William McDonald (11 July 1896 – 1970) was a Welsh amateur footballer who played in the Football League for Newport County as an inside left. He was capped by Wales at amateur level.

References 

Welsh footballers
English Football League players
Wales amateur international footballers
Association football inside forwards
1896 births
Sportspeople from Penarth
1970 deaths
Place of death missing
Lovell's Athletic F.C. players
Barry Town United F.C. players